Rory Stewart (born 19 July 1996 in Perth) is a Scottish professional squash player. As of April 2022, he was ranked number 67 in the world. He has competed in multiple professional squash tournaments and has represented Scotland internationally.

References

1996 births
Living people
Scottish male squash players
Competitors at the 2017 World Games
20th-century Scottish people
21st-century Scottish people